Rasa Žemantauskaitė (born 11 January 1981) is a Lithuanian basketball point guard. She competed for Lithuania at the 2002 World Championships and 2003 and 2013 European championships.

References

1981 births
Living people
Lithuanian women's basketball players
Basketball players from Kaunas
Point guards